The 1959–60 season was the 80th season of competitive football in England.

Diary of the season

17 November 1959: Phil Taylor resigns as manager of lowly Liverpool, languishing in the lower depths of the Second Division, after three years as manager, with all three of his seasons in charge ending with a narrow failure to win promotion to the First Division.

1 December 1959: Bill Shankly of Huddersfield Town accepts the offer to become Second Division club Liverpool's new manager.

25 December 1959: The last Football League games to be played on Christmas Day are held – Blackburn defeated Blackpool 1–0 in the First Division and Coventry beat Wrexham 5–3 in the Third Division.

15 March 1960 Second Division Manchester City pay Huddersfield Town a club record £55,000 transfer fee for Denis Law.

7 May 1960: Wolverhampton Wanderers defeat Blackburn Rovers 3–0 in the FA Cup final at Wembley Stadium, with two goals from Norman Deeley and an own goal from Mick McGrath.

Honours

Notes = Number in parentheses is the times that club has won that honour. * indicates new record for competition

Awards
Football Writers' Association
 Footballer of the Year – Bill Slater (Wolverhampton Wanderers)

Football League

First Division
Burnley failed to top the First Division all season, but pipped Wolves to top spot on the final day of their season to clinch the title. Wolves finished their season on 30-April on 54 points. Burnley's last game of the season was on Monday, 2 May, which they won to move to 55 points. The runners-up Wolves, while missing out on a third successive league title and becoming the first team this century to win the elusive double, went on to win the FA Cup this season. Tottenham Hotspur, West Bromwich Albion and newly promoted Sheffield Wednesday completed the top five. Manchester United, last season's runners-up, dipped to seventh in the league this season despite 32 goals from forward Dennis Viollet and the mid-season signing of half-back Maurice Setters. Luton Town, last season's FA Cup finalists, went down in bottom place, and were joined in relegation by Leeds United.

Second Division
Aston Villa earned an immediate return to the First Division as Second Division champions, and were joined in promotion by runners-up Cardiff City. Liverpool's change of manager from Phil Taylor to Bill Shankly was not enough to earn them promotion, as they finished in third place, eight points adrift of promotion. Huddersfield Town could only finish sixth in the Second Division despite the goals of brilliant young forward Denis Law, who was sold to Manchester City towards the end of the season for a national record fee.

Hull City and Bristol City went down to the Third Division.

Third Division
The Third Division promotion race was very much a two-horse race for much of the season, ending with Southampton going up as champions and Norwich City as runners-up.

Accrington Stanley, Wrexham, York City and Mansfield Town went down to the Fourth Division.

Fourth Division
Walsall sealed the Fourth Division title and with it a place in the Third Division. They were joined in the higher division by Notts County, Torquay United and Watford.

Gateshead were voted out of the Football League and replaced by ambitious Southern League side Peterborough United, who boasted a 30,000-capacity stadium.

Top goalscorers

First Division
Dennis Viollet (Manchester United) – 32 goals

Second Division
Brian Clough (Middlesbrough) – 39 goals

Third Division
Derek Reeves (Southampton) – 39 goals

Fourth Division
Cliff Holton (Watford) – 42 goals

References